West Iqiebor (born 1 October 1964) is a Nigerian judoka. He competed in the men's middleweight event at the 1988 Summer Olympics.

References

1964 births
Living people
Nigerian male judoka
Olympic judoka of Nigeria
Judoka at the 1988 Summer Olympics
Place of birth missing (living people)
African Games medalists in judo
Competitors at the 1987 All-Africa Games
Competitors at the 1991 All-Africa Games
African Games silver medalists for Nigeria
African Games bronze medalists for Nigeria
20th-century Nigerian people
21st-century Nigerian people